The Banruo Temple, also pronounced Bore, is a Buddhist temple located in Nanguan District of Changchun, Jilin, China.

History
In 1923, master Tanxu went to Changchun, capital of Jilin province, to teach the Heart Sutra, and founded the Banruo Temple subsequently. On September 18, 1931, the September 18th incident broke out, then the Japanese army occupied Changchun. In order to build a railway, they demolished Banruo Temple. The temple was moved to Changchun Street and renamed "Huguo Banruo Temple" in 1934. In 1936, the Shanmen, Hall of Four Heavenly Kings and Mahavira Hall were successively completed. Master Tanxu held a consecration ceremony.

In 1983, Banruo Temple has been designated as a National Key Buddhist Temple in Han Chinese Area by the State Council of China.

Architecture
The entire complex divided into three courtyards. Along the central axis of the temple stand seven buildings including the Shanmen, Hall of Four Heavenly Kings, Hall of Maitreya, Mahavira Hall, Hall of the Three Sages of the West, and Buddhist Texts Library. Subsidiary structures were built on both sides of the central axis including the Drum Tower, Bell Tower, and wing-rooms.

Shanmen
In the center of the eaves of the Shanmen is a plaque, on which there are the words "Huguo Banruo Temple". On both sides of the shanmen there are two Chinese guardian lions.

Hall of Four Heavenly Kings
Maitreya is enshrined in the Hall of Heavenly King and at the back of his statue is a statue of Skanda. Four Heavenly Kings' statues are enshrined in the left and right side of the hall.

Mahavira Hall
The Mahavira Hall is the main hall in the temple. In the middle of the hall placed the statue of Sakyamuni, with statue of Guanyin at his back. The statues of Eighteen Arhats stand on both sides of the hall.

Hall of the Three Sages of the West
The Hall of the Three Sages of the West enshrining the Three Saints of the West, namely Guanyin, Amitabha and Mahasthamaprapta.

List of abbots

References

Bibliography

External links
 

Buddhist temples in Jilin
Buildings and structures in Changchun
Tourist attractions in Changchun
1936 establishments in China
20th-century Buddhist temples
Religious buildings and structures completed in 1936